Aasha Davis (born August 17, 1973) is an American actress best known for her roles as Waverly Grady on Friday Night Lights and Chelsea Lewis on South of Nowhere.

Career 
Davis is best known for playing the role of Waverly Grady on Friday Night Lights.  She has also appeared in Gilmore Girls, Grey's Anatomy, House, ER, Castle, and The Shield. Davis was featured in Gnarls Barkley's music video for "Who's Gonna Save My Soul" in mid 2008.

In 2011, she played opposite Adepero Oduye in the film Pariah.

In 2012, she guest-starred in the second season of the Jane Espenson-scripted romantic comedy web series Husbands.

Most recently, Aasha is producing and starring in a web series featured on YouTube called The Unwritten Rules, which is based on series creator Kim Williams's book 40 Hours and an Unwritten Rule: The Diary of an African-American Woman.

In 2019, Aasha starred as Bernadette in the rural Louisiana murder mystery The Long Shadow.

Personal life 
In 2002, Davis married Jesse Pforzheimer They have one son born in January 2009.

Davis's older sister, Lesley Herring, disappeared in Los Angeles on February 8, 2009, after a fight with her husband, Lyle Stanford Herring, Sr. Davis reported her sister as missing when she failed to show up to work, her husband having neglected to do so. Lyle Herring was charged with his wife's murder and in April 2010 pleaded not guilty. On April 8, 2013, he was convicted of the second-degree murder of his wife. To date, her body has not been found. A 2011 episode of Nancy Grace and a June 7, 2013, episode of Dateline NBC covered Davis's sister's case.

Filmography

Film

Television

References

External links 

 
 

Living people
American television actresses
1974 births
21st-century American actresses
American film actresses
African-American actresses
21st-century African-American women
21st-century African-American people
20th-century African-American people
20th-century African-American women